Eternity is a term in philosophy referring to the idea of forever or to timelessness.

Eternity may also refer to:

Comics
 Eternity (character), a fictional cosmic entity in Marvel Comics
 Eternity Comics, an imprint of Malibu Comics
 Kid Eternity, a superhero in Quality Comics and DC Comics

Literature
 Eternity (novel), a 1988 novel by Greg Bear
 Eternity, an organization in the 1955 Isaac Asimov novel The End of Eternity
 The Eternity Cure, a 2013 young adult novel by Julie Kagawa

Magazines
 Eternity (magazine), a defunct American Christian magazine
 Eternity (newspaper), an Australian Christian newspaper founded in 2009
 Eternity SF, a 1970s American science fiction magazine

Film and television
 Eternity (1943 film), a controversial 1943 film made in Japanese-occupied China
 Eternity (1989 film), a Canadian animated short film
 Eternity (1990 film), a film starring Jon Voight
 Eternity (2010 Thai film), a Thai film
 Eternity (2010 South African film), a South African film
 Eternity (2013 film), a New Zealand film directed by Alex Galvin
 Eternity: The Movie (2014 film), an American film
 Eternity (2016 film), a French film
 Eternity (2018 film), a Peruvian film
 "Eternity" (Angel), a 2000 episode of the television show Angel
 Eternity, a 1993 TVB drama, starring Faye Wong

Music

Performers
 Eternity∞, a side-project by Jade Valerie and Roberto "Geo" Rosan, also an album by the group
 Eternity (group), a South Korean virtual band

Albums
 Eternity (Alice Coltrane album), 1975
 Eternity (Amplifier EP), 2008
 Eternity (Anathema album), and the three-part title song
 Eternity (April EP), 2017
 Eternity (DJ Heavygrinder), 2008 album
 Eternity (Every Little Thing album), 2000
 Eternity (Freedom Call album), 2002
 Eternity (Kamelot album), and the title song
 Eternity (Kangta album), and the title song
 Eternity (Michael Learns to Rock album), and the title song
 Eternity (Tina Guo album), 2013
 Eternity: Best of 93 – 98, by Takara
 Sempiternal (album), the fourth studio album by British rock band Bring Me the Horizon

Songs
 "Eternity" (VIXX song), a 2014 single recorded by South Korean idol group VIXX
 "Eternity/The Road to Mandalay", a 2001 single by Robbie Williams
 "Eternity", a 1969 single by Vikki Carr
 "Eternity", by Alibi (Armin van Buuren and Tiesto)
 "Eternity", by capsule from the album Flash Back
 "Eternity", by Dark Moor from the album Dark Moor
 "Eternity", by Dreams Come True from the soundtrack for the film The Swan Princess
 "Eternity", by Jolin Tsai from the album Don't Stop
 "Eternity", by Jonas Brothers from the album Flesh Gordon
 "Eternity", by Paul van Dyk featuring Owl City from the album Evolution
 "Eternity", by Sheena Easton from the album No Sound But a Heart
 "Eternity", by Stratovarius from the album Episode
 "Eternity", by Your Memorial from the album Redirect
 Eternity (Ian Gillan single), 2006 song from the video game Blue Dragoon

Other
 Eternity (graffito), a word chalked by Arthur Stace around Sydney, Australia, from the 1940s to the 1960s
 Eternity (fragrance), a Calvin Klein fragrance
 Eternity puzzle, a puzzle game
 Project Eternity, a fantasy role-playing video game
 Eternity Range
 Eternity clause, a clause intended to ensure that the law or constitution cannot be changed by amendment

See also
 Eternal (disambiguation)
 Eternalism (disambiguation)
 Walang Hanggan (disambiguation)
 Forever (disambiguation)
 Timeless (disambiguation)